Hugo Sebastián Lavados Montes (born 4 February 1950) is a Chilean politician and lawyer who served as minister during the first government of Michelle Bachelet (2006–2010).

References

External Links
 Lavados Profile at Corfo

1949 births
Living people
Chilean people
University of Chile alumni
Boston University alumni
21st-century Chilean politicians
Christian Democratic Party (Chile) politicians